The American rosefinches that form the genus Haemorhous, are a group of passerine birds in the finch family Fringillidae. As the name implies ("haemo" means "blood" in Greek), various shades of red are characteristic plumage colors of this group. They are found throughout the North American continent.

The genus is not closely related to the Carpodacus rosefinches that are found in Europe and Asia.

Systematics 
There have been a number of rosefinch radiations. One of the first to split off were the ancestors of the North American species and diverged in the Middle Miocene (about 14–12 mya) from the proto-rosefinches.

Within the genus the House Finch is the outgroup, meaning the Purple and Cassin's finches are more closely related to one another than either is to the House Finch.

Species
The genus contains three species:

References